
Gmina Marcinowice is a rural gmina (administrative district) in Świdnica County, Lower Silesian Voivodeship, in south-western Poland.

Neighbouring gminas
Gmina Marcinowice is bordered by the gminas of Dzierżoniów, Łagiewniki, Mietków, Sobótka, Świdnica and Żarów.

Villages
The gmina contains the villages of Biała, Chwałków, Gola Świdnicka, Gruszów, Kątki, Klecin, Krasków, Marcinowice, Mysłaków, Sady, Śmiałowice, Stefanowice, Strzelce, Szczepanów, Tąpadła, Tworzyjanów, Wirki, Wiry and Zebrzydów.

Twin towns – sister cities

Gmina Marcinowice is twinned with:
 Tanvald, Czech Republic

References

Marcinowice
Świdnica County